Meet Claude King is a studio album by country music singer Claude King. It was released in 1962 by Columbia Records (catalog no. CS-8610). The album includes King's No. 1 Country single, "Wolverton Mountain".

In Billboard magazine's annual poll of country and western disc jockeys, it was ranked No. 2 among the "Favorite Country Music LPs" of 1962.

AllMusic gave the album two-and-a-half stars.

Track listing
Side A
 "The Comancheros"
 "You're Breaking My Heart"
 "I'm Just Here to Get My Baby Out of Jail"
 "Give Me Your Love and I'll Give You Mine"
 "Big River, Big Man"
 "Sweet Lovin'"

Side B
 "Wolverton Mountain"
 "Would You Care?"
 "Pistol Packin' Papa"
 "Little Bitty Heart"
 "I Can't Get Over the Way You Got Over Me"
 "I Backed Out"

References

1962 albums
Country albums by American artists
Columbia Records albums